Arne Sicker (born 17 April 1997) is a German professional footballer who plays as a defender for SV Sandhausen.

Career
In the summer of 2019, Sicker was signed by MSV Duisburg. After two years, he moved to SV Sandhausen in the summer of 2021.

Career statistics

References

External links

1997 births
Living people
People from Eckernförde
Footballers from Schleswig-Holstein
German footballers
Association football defenders
Holstein Kiel players
Holstein Kiel II players
SV Sandhausen players
2. Bundesliga players
3. Liga players
Regionalliga players